Pentti Iivari Kyykoski (born Bert Ivar Nordlund, 16 February 1881 – 8 December 1959) was a Finnish gymnast who won bronze in the 1908 Summer Olympics.

Sport 

He won the Nordic students' coxed four rowing championship in the club Akateeminen Urheiluseura in 1905.

He won the Finnish national championship in team gymnastics as a member of Ylioppilasvoimistelijat in 1909.

Biography 

His father was tax collector Lars Victor Nordlund and mother Amanda Gustava Starck. He married Ida Maria Ylönen in 1908. He had two children, Pentti Kalervo (1911–) and Aune-Marjatta (1913–).

He finnicized his name from Nordlund to Kyykoski in 1906.

He completed his matriculation exam in Porin Lyseo in 1900 and graduated as a Master of Science from the Helsinki University of Technology in 1909.

He worked as a technical director and a chief executive officer in various factories in the private sector in 1910–1922. He entered the military sector in 1923 as a technical inspector at the ordnance department of the Ministry of Defence. He completed the engineer officer examination in 1926, reaching the rank of lieutenant colonel engineer in 1933. He eventually retired from the Defence Command in 1949.

He also held various municipal positions of trust.

He was issued orders and medals:
 Cross of Liberty, 3rd Class
 Commemorative Medal of the Winter War
 The commemorative medal of the old Finnish army

References 

1881 births
1959 deaths
Finnish male artistic gymnasts
Gymnasts at the 1908 Summer Olympics
Olympic gymnasts of Finland
Olympic bronze medalists for Finland
Olympic medalists in gymnastics
Medalists at the 1908 Summer Olympics
20th-century Finnish people